Qareh Dowrakhlu-ye Sofla (also Romanized as Qareh Dowrākhlū-ye Soflá; also known as Qara Dūlāglū, Qarah Dūlākhlū, Qareh Delākhlū, Qareh Dolākhlū, Qareh Dowrākhlū-ye Pā’īn, Qareh Dūlākhlū, Qareh Dūlākhlū-ye Pā’īn, and Qareh Dūrākhlū) is a village in Ijrud-e Pain Rural District, Halab District, Ijrud County, Zanjan Province, Iran. At the 2006 census, its population was 37, in 11 families.

References 

Populated places in Ijrud County